HMS Laurel was a 28-gun Enterprise-class sixth-rate frigate of the Royal Navy.  Laurel was first commissioned in October 1779 under the command of Captain Thomas Lloyd. She sailed for the Leeward Islands on 13 April 1780, but was wrecked on 11 October in the Great Hurricane of 1780 at Martinique. Lloyd, and all but 12 of his crew, died.<ref>Lloyd's List[https://hdl.handle.net/2027/uc1.c3049060?urlappend=%3Bseq=432  №1228.]</ref>

 Citations and references 
Citations

References
 Robert Gardiner, The First Frigates, Conway Maritime Press, London 1992. .
 Hepper, David J. (1994) British Warship Losses in the Age of Sail, 1650–1859. (Rotherfield: Jean Boudriot). 
 David Lyon, The Sailing Navy List'', Conway Maritime Press, London 1993. .

1779 ships
Sixth-rate frigates of the Royal Navy
Shipwrecks in the Caribbean Sea
Maritime incidents in 1780